The  is an art museum founded in 1968. It was reconstructed in 1996. It is located near Shukkei-en in Hiroshima, Japan.

Access
Hiroden Shukkeien-mae Station
JR Hiroshima Station

See also
Hiroshima Museum of Art
Hiroshima City Museum of Contemporary Art
Shukkei-en

External links
 hpam.jp

Art museums and galleries in Japan
Museums in Hiroshima
Art museums established in 1968
Prefectural museums
1968 establishments in Japan